Russian Meat is a 1997 Croatian film directed by Lukas Nola.

External links

Russian Meat at Filmski-Programi.hr 

1997 films
1990s Croatian-language films
Films directed by Lukas Nola
Croatian crime drama films
1997 crime drama films